The Jimmy Mann Evans Memorial Bridge is a , steel stringer, multibeam bridge which carries Interstate 40 (I-40) across Kentucky Lake, part of the Tennessee River, in the western part of the U.S. state of Tennessee. The bridge also spans the boundaries between Benton and Humphreys counties and the western and middle parts of the state.

Description

The Jimmy Mann Evans Memorial Bridge carries four lanes of I-40 on a single span across the Kentucky Lake impoundment of the Tennessee River. This is the historical boundary between Middle and West Tennessee, as defined in the Tennessee State Constitution. West of the bridge is a causeway above a floodplain created by Kentucky Dam.

History
Construction began on the bridge on November 29, 1962. The bridge was the largest project on I-40 between Memphis and Nashville. The bridge was completed on July 21, 1965. The entire project cost $4.62 million (equivalent to $ in ). The segment of I-40 between Memphis and Nashville, the first section of interstate completed between two major cities in Tennessee, was dedicated on July 24, 1966, in a ceremony officiated by then-governor Frank G. Clement and U.S. Senator Albert Gore Sr. on the bridge. The bridge was renovated in 1992 and named after Jimmy Mann Evans who served as president of the Tennessee Road Builders Association and as commissioner of the Tennessee Department of Transportation (TDOT) from 1987 until his death in 1992.

The murder of Holly Bobo reportedly took place underneath the bridge in April 2011.

See also
List of crossings of the Tennessee River

References

Interstate 40
Bridges over the Tennessee River
Transportation in Benton County, Tennessee
Transportation in Humphreys County, Tennessee
Bridges completed in 1965
Bridges on the Interstate Highway System
Road bridges in Tennessee
1965 establishments in Tennessee